Stomatocalyceae is a tribe of plant of the family Euphorbiaceae. It comprises 2 subtribes and 4 genera.

References

 
Euphorbiaceae tribes